Racławówka  is a village in the administrative district of Gmina Boguchwała, within Rzeszów County, Subcarpathian Voivodeship, in south-eastern Poland.

References

Villages in Rzeszów County